William Acton was an English politician who was bailiff of Newcastle-upon-Tyne "almost continuously" from 1336 until 1351, and was MP for that place twice during then. Two of his sons - Laurence and William - and a grandson Laurence Acton were MPs.

References

English MPs 1335–36
English MPs 1348
Politicians from Newcastle upon Tyne